While New York Sleeps is a 1920 American crime drama film produced by Fox Film Corporation and directed by Charles Brabin, who was the husband of actress Theda Bara. The film tells three distinct episodic stories using the same actors, Estelle Taylor and Marc McDermott. Long thought to be a lost film like many other Fox Film productions from this period, a copy of this movie is now in the collection of the UCLA Film and Television Archive.

Plot
As described in a film magazine, in the first story a  suburban wife (Taylor) has married a wealthy man (Locke) in the belief that her first husband (McDermott), a cad, had been killed. While the second husband is away, her first husband appears and demands money for his silence. A struggle ensues after a burglar (Southern) enters the home to rob it, and the burglar shoots the first husband. The wife, hearing her second husband arriving in his car, takes the revolver in her hand as the burglar escapes, telling her second husband that she shot a burglar (the body of her first husband). The second episode is a recital of the badger game with the vamp (Taylor), the man (McDermott), and his friend (Southern), and includes a scene depicting the Frolic at Ziegfeld Follies. The third episode involves a tragedy that takes place in New York's Lower East Side.

Cast
Estelle Taylor as A Wife / The Vamp / The Girl
William Locke as Her husband
Marc McDermott as Strange Visitor / The Man / The Paralytic
Harry Southern as Burglar / Friend / His Son
Earl Metcalfe as The Gangster

Reception
According to author Aubrey Solomon, this film was Fox's biggest moneymaker for the year 1920 with a profit of $192,000. While this would seem to conflict with the enormous success of Fox's Over the Hill to the Poorhouse (1920), the latter film did not achieve its largest rentals until it went into full release in 1921.

References

External links

Still at www.iheartmyart.com

1920 films
American silent feature films
Films directed by Charles Brabin
Fox Film films
American crime drama films
1920 crime drama films
American black-and-white films
1920s rediscovered films
Rediscovered American films
1920s American films
Silent American drama films